Nakhl-e Jamal (also Romanized as Nakhl-e Jamāl and Nakhl-i-Jamāl) is a village in Moqam Rural District, Shibkaveh District, Bandar Lengeh County, Hormozgan Province, Iran. At the 2006 census, its population was 363, in 66 families.

References 

Populated places in Bandar Lengeh County